Chongoleani is both a village and an administrative ward in the shape of a peninsula in Tanga District of Tanga Region in Tanzania. 
According to the 2012 census, the ward has a total population of 4,737. The ward is home to Bird Island, Chongoleani primary school and Putini primary school.

Chongoleani is also a village on the Easternmost end of the administrative ward, East of Mpirani and Ndaoya, and south of the villages Kizingani and Kwale.

References

Wards of Tanga Region